Selim Mbareki (born 6 March 1996) is a Tunisian volleyball player. He competed in the 2020 Summer Olympics.

References

1996 births
Living people
Volleyball players at the 2020 Summer Olympics
Tunisian men's volleyball players
Olympic volleyball players of Tunisia